The 2004 International Raiffeisen Grand Prix was a men's tennis tournament played on outdoor clay courts in Sankt Pölten, Austria, and was part of the International Series of the 2004 ATP Tour. It was the 24th edition of the tournament and was held from May 17 through May 23, 2004. Eighth-seeded Filippo Volandri won the singles title.

Finals

Singles
 Filippo Volandri defeated  Xavier Malisse 6–1, 6–4
 It was Volandri's first singles title of the year and of his career.

Doubles
 Mariano Hood /  Petr Pála defeated  Tomáš Cibulec /  Leoš Friedl 3–6, 7–5, 6–4

References

International Raiffeisen Grand Prix
Hypo Group Tennis International
May 2004 sports events in Europe
2004 in Austrian tennis